Bataan is a province of the Philippines.

Bataan may also refer to:

Places
 Bataan Peninsula, the landmass in which Bataan province lies, the Philippines
 Bataan National Park, a protected area in Bataan Peninsula, Philippines
 Bataan, a barangay in San Juan, Batangas, Philippines
 Batán, Costa Rica, also referred to as Bataan, a district of the Matina canton, Limón province, Costa Rica

Other uses
 Battle of Bataan, a battle in 1942 in the Pacific War of World War II
 USS Bataan, the names of two United States ships
 Bataan (film), a 1943 film
 Joe Bataan (born 1942), American Latin soul musician

See also
 Bataan 1 and Bataan 2, the call signs for two disarmed Mitsubishi G4M "Betty" bombers
 
 Batan (disambiguation)
 Batanes